Edward Jan (or Ewald Oskar) Dytko (18 October 1914 – 13 June 1993) was a Polish football player, who, when his home country became Poland by Treaty of Versailles represented the no longer existing team of Dąb Katowice, also in 1935-39 he played in the Polish National Team.

He was born in Zalenze (now a district of Katowice) and since early childhood played soccer. In 1931 he became a player of Dab, where he spent his all career. In 1936, his team was promoted to the Polish Soccer League, but due to Dąb's disqualification, the club was relegated in the middle of the 1937 season.

His national debut occurred on 18 August 1935 in Katowice, against Yugoslavia. Soon Dytko became a key midfield, participating in 25 games. He played in the 1936 Olympic Games in Berlin (in all four games of the Polish Team), also in a legendary World Cup Soccer 1938 game Poland - Brazil 5-6 (5 June 1938, Strasbourg, France). On 27 August 1939 Dytko took part in the last (and one of the best) match of interwar Polish National Team - at Warsaw, vs. Hungary (4-2)

Dytko is regarded as the co-author of the biggest successes of Polish soccer in the interwar period.

During the Second World War, he signed the German nationality list (Volksliste) and in 1942 was drafted into the Wehrmacht. In 1944 he was captured by the U.S. Army and for a while was kept at a POW camp in Austria.

After the war he returned to Silesia and his beloved team, representing Dab until 1950. Like many other inhabitants of Upper Silesia, he had problems with the communist government, which initially treated him as a traitor. He was cleared, but only after signing the declaration of loyalty to the Polish state.

After 1950 he worked as a coach in several Silesian teams, but without major successes. He died in Katowice.

See also
Polish Roster in World Cup Soccer France 1938
The last game: August 27, 1939. Poland - Hungary 4-2

References

1914 births
1993 deaths
Sportspeople from Katowice
Polish footballers
Olympic footballers of Poland
Footballers at the 1936 Summer Olympics
1938 FIFA World Cup players
Poland international footballers
People from the Province of Silesia
German prisoners of war in World War II held by the United States
Association football midfielders
German Army personnel of World War II
Volksdeutsche